Jeffrey Bruce Christensen (born January 8, 1960) is a former American football quarterback in the National Football League. He played for the Cincinnati Bengals, Philadelphia Eagles and Cleveland Browns. He played college football for the Eastern Illinois Panthers.

His son Jake played college football at Iowa and Eastern Illinois.

References

1960 births
Living people
American football quarterbacks
Cincinnati Bengals players
Philadelphia Eagles players
Cleveland Browns players
Eastern Illinois Panthers football players
People from Gibson City, Illinois